Solomon Serwanjja is a Ugandan investigative journalist and the Executive Director of the African Institute for Investigative Journalism (AIIJ). On 13 July 2021, he resigned from his position as news anchor with NBSTV ending his 13 year career on television. In 2019 Serwanjja was awarded the Komla Dumor Award, an annual award given by the BBC to celebrate African journalists. He holds a Masters Degree in Journalism and Communication from Makerere University.

Life and career  
Serwanjja is a United Nations Reham al-Farra Memorial Journalism fellow 2018 and has worked as a news anchor and reporter for several television stations in East Africa including NBS TV, KTN News, NTV Uganda, UBC TV.

Serwanjja is married to Vivian Serwanjja and they have four children: Amani, Imani, Upendo and Asante.

Awards 

BBC Komla Dumor Award 2019
 Journalist of the Year 2017 - ACME AWARD
 Post 2015 UN Award (Broadcast Category)

References 

Ugandan journalists
Living people
1986 births